Caloptilia melanocarpae is a moth of the family Gracillariidae. It is known from Quebec, Canada, and Utah and California in the United States.

The larvae feed on Prunus melanocarpa and Prunus virginiana. They mine the leaves of their host plant. The mine starts as a narrow snail-like track, which becomes an elongate blotch on the underside of the leaf, located along the leaf margin.

References

melanocarpae
Moths of North America
Moths described in 1925